Eugeniusz Faber (6 April 1939 – 24 September 2021) was a Polish footballer who played as a forward for Ruch Chorzów and Lens.

References

External links
 

1939 births
2021 deaths
Polish footballers
Association football forwards
Poland international footballers
Ruch Chorzów players
RC Lens players
Ekstraklasa players
Ligue 1 players
Ligue 2 players
Olympic footballers of Poland
Footballers at the 1960 Summer Olympics
Sportspeople from Chorzów
Polish expatriate footballers
Polish expatriate sportspeople in France
Expatriate footballers in France